is a 2019 action-adventure game developed by FromSoftware and published by Activision. The game follows a shinobi known as Wolf, who attempts to take revenge on a samurai clan that imprisoned him and kidnapped his lord. The gameplay is focused on stealth, exploration, and combat, with a particular emphasis on boss battles. It takes place in a fictionalized Japan during the Sengoku period and makes strong references to Buddhist mythology and philosophy.

Sekiro was released for PlayStation 4, Windows, and Xbox One in March 2019, and for Stadia in October 2020. Lead director Hidetaka Miyazaki wanted to create a new intellectual property (IP) that marked a departure from their Dark Souls series, looking at games such as Tenchu for inspiration. Sekiro was praised by critics, who complimented its gameplay and setting, and compared it to Dark Souls, although opinions on its difficulty were mixed. It won several year-end awards and sold over five million copies by July 2020.

Gameplay 

Sekiro: Shadows Die Twice is an action-adventure game played from a third-person view. Compared to FromSoftware's Dark Souls series, the game features fewer role-playing elements, lacks character creation and the ability to level up a variety of stats, and has no multiplayer elements. It does, however, include gear upgrading, a skill tree, and limited ability customization. Rather than attacking to whittle an enemy's health points, combat in Sekiro revolves around using a katana to attack their posture and balance instead, eventually leading to an opening that allows for a single killing blow.

The game also features stealth elements, allowing players to instantly eliminate some enemies if they can get in range undetected. In addition, the player character can use various tools to assist with combat and exploration, such as a grappling hook. If the player character dies, they can be revived on the spot if they have resurrection power, which is restored by defeating enemies, instead of respawning at earlier checkpoints.

Plot
Following the Sengoku period, Isshin Ashina seized control of the land of Ashina. During this time, a nameless orphan is adopted by the wandering shinobi known as Owl, who names the boy Wolf and trains him in the ways of the shinobi. Two decades later, Ashina is on the brink of collapse due to the now elderly Isshin falling ill and the Interior Ministry, a group set on unifying Japan, steadily closing in. Desperate to save his clan, Isshin's adoptive grandson Genichiro seeks the immortal Divine Heir Kuro in hopes of using the Dragon Heritage in his blood to create an immortal army. Wolf, now a full-fledged shinobi and Kuro's bodyguard, fights Genichiro but loses both Kuro and his left arm. However, being immortal, Wolf survives and is found by a retired shinobi known as the Sculptor. The Sculptor nurses Wolf back to health and gifts him a prosthetic arm.

To rescue Kuro, Wolf assaults Ashina Castle whilst being forced to confront his past; Three years ago, Kuro's birthplace, the Hirata estate, was raided by bandits led by Wolf's former teacher, Lady Butterfly. While Wolf was able to defeat her, he was stabbed in the back by an unknown assailant but survived after Kuro made him immortal using the Dragon Heritage. In the present, Wolf once again confronts Genichiro and defeats him, forcing him to flee. Kuro asks Wolf to perform the Immortal Severance ritual, which would result in Kuro's death and prevent anyone from fighting over his immortality. Wolf reluctantly agrees and sets out to collect the necessary materials for the ritual. Wolf's quest leads him to cross paths with Isshin, who gives him a new name: Sekiro, the "one-armed wolf".

After collecting all the components for the ritual, Sekiro is confronted by Owl, who is revealed to be the assailant who backstabbed Sekiro at the Hirata estate. Owl reveals he also seeks the Dragon Heritage and orders Sekiro to renounce his loyalty to Kuro. If Sekiro sides with Owl, he is forced to fight Isshin's doctor, Emma, and Isshin himself. After defeating them, Sekiro betrays Owl while Kuro realizes he has been corrupted by bloodlust, resulting in the "Shura" ending. If Kuro is chosen, Sekiro fights and kills Owl. Sekiro then enters the Divine Realm to collect the final material for the ritual. Upon returning to Ashina, Sekiro discovers Isshin has succumbed to his illness and that the castle is under attack by the Interior Ministry. Sekiro eventually finds Kuro under attack by Genichiro, whom he defeats again. Realizing Ashina is lost, Genichiro sacrifices himself in a ritual to revive Isshin in his prime so that he might restore Ashina. Isshin honors his grandson's wish and fights Sekiro.

After defeating Isshin, there are three possible endings. Performing the Immortal Severance ritual results in the eponymous standard ending, where the Dragon Heritage is removed at the cost of Kuro's life. Afterward, like the Sculptor before him, Sekiro retires as a shinobi and spends the remainder of his days carving Buddha Statues. Working with Emma to find an alternative way of severing immortality results in the Purification ending, where Sekiro sacrifices himself instead of Kuro. The final ending, Dragon's Homecoming, is obtained by helping a character known as the Divine Child of the Rejuvenating Waters. Kuro's body dies, but his spirit lives on inside the Divine Child, who goes on a journey with Sekiro to return the Dragon Heritage to its original place.

Development

Development of Sekiro began in late 2015 following the completion of Bloodborne downloadable content, The Old Hunters. It was directed by Hidetaka Miyazaki, who had previously worked on the Dark Souls series and Bloodborne. Sekiro draws inspiration from the Tenchu series of stealth-action games partially developed and published by FromSoftware. The team initially considered developing the game as a sequel to Tenchu; however, it quickly outgrew the concept. Miyazaki intended the combat changes to capture the feel of "swords clashing", with fighters trying to create an opening to deliver the fatal strike. He and the team also created the game to be an entirely single-player experience, as they believed multiplayer to have limitations they wanted to avoid. Despite the game taking place during the Sengoku period of real-world Japanese history, no historical people or locations are featured in the game.

The game was revealed via a teaser trailer at The Game Awards 2017 in December, showing the tagline "Shadows Die Twice". The game's full title was revealed to be Sekiro: Shadows Die Twice during Microsoft's press conference at E3 2018. The game was published by Activision worldwide, with FromSoftware self-publishing it in Japan and Cube Game publishing in the Asia-Pacific region. Sekiro soundtrack was composed by Yuka Kitamura, with some contributions from Noriyuki Asakura. The game was released for PlayStation 4, Windows, and Xbox One on 22 March 2019. A collectors edition was also released the same day and included a steelbook case, a figurine of the protagonist, an art book, a physical map of the game's world, a download code for the soundtrack, and in-game coin replicas. A port for Stadia was released in late 2020. On 31 October 2020, a free update was released that added new content to the game, such as new cosmetics for Wolf and a boss rush game mode.

The word "sekirō" (隻狼) is a contraction of "sekiwan no ōkami" (隻腕の狼), which translates as "one-armed wolf." The subtitle "Shadows Die Twice" was initially meant to be used as a slogan for the teaser trailer until Activision requested it be kept for the final name.

Reception

According to review aggregator Metacritic, Sekiro received "universal acclaim" for the PlayStation 4 and Xbox One versions and "generally favorable" reviews for the Windows version. Many critics praised the game's combat for departing from the typical style of FromSoftware's other similar games. In a review for Destructoid, Chris Carter described open combat as "akin to a waltz" and praised the variety of ways the combat could be approached, writing that players had more choices than in Dark Souls or Bloodborne. Brandin Tyrell from IGN praised the game's focus on "split-second swordsmanship", and although "to any Souls veteran, Sekiro timing-based lock-on combat of strikes and slashes is familiar", the game's "sense of safety" caused the combat to feel "refreshing and new". PC Gamer journalist Tom Senior called the combat "beautiful" and praised the posture system, writing that "instead of chipping down health bars until the enemy keels over, you overwhelm their posture bar with strikes and perfect parries until an opening appears, and then finish with a deathblow". He stated that the system takes "the catharsis" of beating a great boss and "focuses all that emotion into one split second". In a review for the website GameSpot, Tamoor Hussain wrote that the game "rewrites the rules of engagement", stating that, while previous FromSoftware games demanded quick decision-making, Sekiro "pushes these demands further" than ever before. Reviewers also praised the resurrection mechanic, with Carter calling it "genius", and the stealth options, which gave the player freedom without descending into frustration.

The level design was also praised. Particular emphasis was given to the player's increased verticality due to the addition of the grappling hook and a dedicated jump button. Tyrell wrote that the grappling hook "sends ripples throughout the gameplay", writing that "where all previous Soulsborne characters felt rooted firmly to the ground as they trudged down hallways and slowly climbed ladders, Sekiro level design has permission to be much more vertical". Carter wrote that the hook provided "a more vertical and in some cases more challenging level design from an exploration standpoint". Senior wrote that the game used "large but separate zones rather than a huge connected world" but praised the "many secrets hidden just off the critical path, often reached with the excellent grappling hook, which lets you vault between tree branches and rooftops". The levels themselves were also praised, with Hussain writing that "buildings are placed together to encourage exploration and reconnaissance, with roofs almost touching so that you can leap between them and scope out all angles", with the branching paths "creating that satisfying feeling of venturing into the unknown and then emerging into the familiar".

Reaction to the lack of online multiplayer was mixed. Several reviewers noted that this allowed the game to have a full pause button, which was praised. However, Tyrell noted that he "missed the small notes left by others in the world alerting me to imminent threats or hidden secrets, or that vague sense that danger lurks behind me in the form of an invading player" that defined the experience of playing "Soulsborne" games. He also noticed the "lack of PvP battles, which seem[ed] like a waste of the new emphasis on skill-based swordsmanship" and argued that the parrying and blocking mechanics would have suited online play.

Similarly to other FromSoftware games, the game's high difficulty level polarised players and journalists. Several reviewers praised the difficulty, with Senior calling it "brutal" but "spectacular". Hussain wrote that the game "punishes you for missteps" and was "suited for people of a certain temperament and with a very specific, slightly masochistic taste in games" but argued that victory was "intense" and "gratifying". Tyrell wrote that the combat had a "steep curve to mastering it" but argued it was "somewhat easier than its predecessors" while still providing the sense of being "the greatest swordsman that ever lived" after tough victories. However, several journalists found it too challenging, with Don Rowe from The Spinoff calling it "infuriating" and writing that he was not having fun after six hours with the game. Several days after the game was released, modders managed to develop mods which would make the game easier by changing the speed of the player's character relative to the game. James Davenport of PC Gamer said that the game's final boss was too difficult for him to beat without the help of the software.

Sales
On release day, Sekiro drew over 108,000 concurrent players on Steam, the highest for a new game launched during JanuaryMarch 2019 and the third highest of any Japanese game in the platform's history, behind only Monster Hunter: World and Dark Souls III. Later in March, it had reached over 125,000 concurrent players on Steam, making it one of the most played games on the platform at the time. In its debut week, Sekiro topped the UK and EMEAA (Europe, Middle East, Africa, Asia) charts, surpassing Tom Clancy's The Division 2. In Japan, the game debuted first, with 157,548 retail copies sold in its opening weekend. Within ten days of its release, over twomillion copies were sold worldwide, which rose to over five million by July 2020.

Awards
The game won several awards, including Game of the Year at The Game Awards 2019, by editors of GameSpot, and by fans in the 2019 Steam Awards.

Notes

References

External links

2019 video games
Action-adventure games
Activision games
Edo period in fiction
Dark fantasy video games
Fiction about immortality
FromSoftware games
The Game Award for Game of the Year winners
Patricide in fiction
PlayStation 4 games
PlayStation 4 Pro enhanced games
Sengoku video games
Single-player video games
Soulslike video games
Stadia games
Stealth video games
Video games about ninja
Video games about revenge
Video games about samurai
Video games based on Buddhist mythology
Video games based on Japanese mythology
Video games developed in Japan
Video games directed by Hidetaka Miyazaki
Video games set in feudal Japan
Video games set in the 16th century
Windows games
Works about orphans
Xbox One games
Xbox One X enhanced games